Atractus elaps, the black ground snake, is a species of snake in the family Colubridae. The species can be found in Colombia, Venezuela, Bolivia, Peru, Ecuador, and Brazil.

References 

Atractus
Reptiles of Colombia
Reptiles of Venezuela
Reptiles of Bolivia
Reptiles of Peru
Reptiles of Ecuador
Reptiles of Brazil
Snakes of South America
Reptiles described in 1858
Taxa named by Albert Günther